The Church of the East monastery on Sir Bani Yas is an archaeological site in the United Arab Emirates discovered in 1992. The site is significant as evidence of the presence of Christianity in the UAE in the pre-Islamic period. Believed to be Nestorian, the Christian community  continued for at least a century after the arrival of Islam . 

In 1992 the remnants of an ancient buried building on the eastern side of the island of Sir Bani Yas were discovered, and through further excavations was found to be a 7th century Church of the East Christian monastery which operated for 150 years. The site consists of a church, a monastery and a series of courtyard houses, including dormitories, a kitchen, cells and burial sites. dating to the 7th and 8th centuries CE. The monastery is believed to have housed between 30-40 monks. The complex was built around the sole burial found on the site. Archaeological finds indicate contact with Bahrain, India and Iraq. the site is part of a series of Christian complexes across the Persian Gulf region including Kuwait at both Akkaz and Al Qusur on Failaka Island, at Kharg on the Iranian coastline and in the Eastern Province of Saudi Arabia at Jubail.

In 1995, a site director of the excavation project discovered a Christian cross in the form of a small piece of plaster, identifying it as a Christian site by comparing it to ancient churches known from elsewhere in the Persian Gulf region. Assessments by the team in charge of excavating the ancient Christian monastery concluded that the site was, at one time, home to about 30 monks from the Church of the East. Stucco decorations were found including Nestorian crosses and vine and scroll motifs.

The complex is the oldest Christian site in the UAE.

Other early Christian sites in the UAE 

In 2000 further remains were discovered on the island of Marawah, with a church similar to that on Sir Bani Yas.

References 

Assyrian Church of the East churches
Islands of the United Arab Emirates
Christianity in the United Arab Emirates
7th-century churches
Catholic Church in the Arabian Peninsula
Apostolic Vicariate of Arabia
Apostolic Vicariate of Southern Arabia